Sometimes When We Touch is the twenty-sixth studio album by American country music singer-songwriter Tammy Wynette. It was released on April 1, 1985, by Epic Records.

Commercial performance 
The album peaked at No. 32 on the Billboard Country Albums chart. The album's first single, "Sometimes When We Touch", peaked at No. 6 on the Billboard Country Singles chart, and the second single, "You Can Lead a Heart to Love (But You Can't Make It Fall)", both peaked at No. 48.

Track listing

Chart positions

Album

Singles

References

1985 albums
Tammy Wynette albums
Epic Records albums